Hofsee is a lake at Alt Gaarz, municipality Neu Gaarz, in Mecklenburgische Seenplatte, Mecklenburg-Vorpommern, Germany. At an elevation of 62.9 m, its surface area is 0.44 km².

Lakes of Mecklenburg-Western Pomerania